J. Michael Huey (born October 24, 1950) is an American drummer and producer, earning 18 Gold / Platinum Top Ten Awards. He has played with a diverse group of artists in genres including Rock/Pop/Country/R&B such as Glenn Frey, Joe Walsh, Juice Newton, Etta James, and Lindsey Buckingham. Huey is also noted for his work on film and television soundtracks as well as numerous world tours with Rock & Roll Hall of Fame Inductees. He has also worked as a record producer for major record labels including MCA and Warner Bros.

Early career
Michael Huey started playing the drums while in high school playing in regional bands in Georgia most notably The Kenningtons and 8-Up With Soul who performed at local dance clubs and small venues. In 1969 the Atlanta music manager Johnny Bee encouraged Huey to audition for the pop singer Tommy Roe whose song "Dizzy" had become a worldwide hit that year. The audition was a success and Roe, who was signed to the Bill Lowery Organization, hired Huey to play drums on his national ‘Dizzy’ tour.

Atlanta years
After the 'Dizzy' tour had ended Huey returned to playing smaller venues. The saxophone player Grainger “Brother” Hines of The Swingin' Medallions ("Double Shot of My Baby's Love") was in an Atlanta bar where Huey was performing and invited Huey to play drums for The Swingin' Medallions; Huey accepted and replaced Ron Nobles. The Swingin' Medallions were also represented by Bill Lowery.

In 1970 Huey played drums on tracks from the album Color Him Father by The Winstons. In 1971 he became the drummer for the Classics IV and during this period was also hired as staff drummer for the Lowery Group. Huey’s earlier work for The Winstons led to his involvement with the Allen Toussaint produced 1974 album Frankie Miller’s Highlife by Frankie Miller. As the staff drummer for Lowery Studios, Huey played drums on numerous sessions most notably for Johnny Nash, Billy Joe Royal, The Tams, Joe South, Clarence Carter, Mylon LeFevre, Sam Moore (Sam & Dave) and Sami Jo.

Los Angeles years
In 1976, Michael Huey moved to Los Angeles where he played drums on recording sessions as well as world tours for Walter Egan (including the hit single "Magnet and Steel"), Michael Martin Murphey, Johnny Lee, Chris Hillman of The Byrds, Gene Clark of The Byrds, Joanne Mackell, The Osmonds, Blue Steel, Rob Grill of The Grass Roots, Lindsey Buckingham of Fleetwood Mac, Juice Newton and many other artists.

In 1981, the producer and arrranger Jim Ed Norman hired Huey to play drums on Glenn Frey's (The Eagles) first solo album, No Fun Aloud, which produced the Top 10 hits "Party Town" and "I Found Somebody". Huey continued to work with Frey for the next twelve years providing the drums on all of his solo records including the hits "Smuggler’s Blues" and "You Belong to the City" from the album The Allnighter. Both tracks were featured on the NBC television series Miami Vice as well as appearing on the Miami Vice soundtrack album which stayed at #1 on the Billboard charts for eleven weeks in 1985. The soundtrack sold over five million copies and won two Grammy Awards making it the most successful TV soundtrack album of all time.

Michael Huey also played on the feature films Beverly Hills Cop, Back to the Future, Boogie Nights, Deuce Bigalow, Sgt. Bilko and Overnight Delivery.

He appeared in concert with Joe Walsh, Etta James and Albert Collins as part of the Jazzvisions series of concerts filmed at the Wiltern Theater, Los Angeles in December 1986 which was subsequently released on video and CD under the title "Jump The Blues Away".

The HBO Special: “Vietnam Veterans Benefit Concert, LA Forum: Featuring Joe Walsh, Bonnie Raitt, and Friends”

Hall of Fame
Rock & Roll Hall of Fame (Records & Tours):  Glenn Frey (The Eagles); Joe Walsh (Eagles); Lindsey Buckingham (Fleetwood Mac); Etta James; Albert Collins; Chris Hillman (Byrds); Gene Clark (Byrds); Allen Toussaint (Producer/Songwriter); Sam Moore (Sam & Dave)
; ; ; 

Georgia Music Hall of Fame (Records & Tours): Tommy Roe; Joe South; The Tams; The Classics IV; Clarence Carter; Billy Joe Royal; Ray Whitley; Mylon LaFevre; Bill Lowery; Paul Cochran.

In 1992, Michael Huey retired from his career as a musician and attended UCLA School of Law. In 1994 he started his own music publishing and production company called HueyTunes.

Music producer and arranger
Michael Huey produced and arranged, as well as played drums on the critically acclaimed album So Rebellious A Lover (1987) for Gene Clark (The Byrds) and Carla Olson (The Textones). Huey also produced the Re-Mastered Collectors’ Edition CD released in 2009.

In 1985 Huey was hired to produce and arrange the music for two of the ‘Miller Genuine Draft’ NBA Semi-Finals and Championship Series (Lakers v Celtics) CBS National TV / Radio advertising campaigns.

In 1990 Huey co-produced The Best of Tommy Roe: Yesterday, Today, & Tomorrow which was released on the Curb Mod Afw label.

Michael Huey has worked as a producer and arranger for the following companies:
MCA/Universal Records
Capitol Records
Curb Records
Warner Brothers Records
Rhino Records
Fuel Records
Miller Corporation
Razor and Tie Records
Rockin’ House Entertainment

Recordings (partial list)

Source

References

External links
 HueyTunes - Official Site

Living people
1950 births
Record producers from Georgia (U.S. state)
Musicians from Atlanta
American rock drummers
People from Bowdon, Georgia
20th-century American drummers
American male drummers
20th-century American male musicians